Cliff Sarde is an American composer, multi-instrumentalist and recording artist.

Biography 
Cliff Sarde is a GRAMMY nominated composer, video editor and recording artist who has received an Emmy, Telly, and numerous Addy awards. Partial credits include The Sopranos, MTV, FOX, ABC, NBC, ESPN, The Weather Channel, NHL, MLB, Bravo, Lifetime, Bio, Oxygen, Entertainment Tonight, Budweiser, Microsoft, Honeywell, Blue Cross Blue Shield AZ.,Insight and Best Western International.

Former recording artist for Atlantic Records, MCA Records, Canyon Records, Passport Jazz Records.

References 
 http://www.answers.com/topic/cliff-sarde?cat=entertainment

External links 
 http://www.ceproductions.net

American male composers
21st-century American composers
Living people
Year of birth missing (living people)
Place of birth missing (living people)
21st-century American male musicians